Punaluu or Punaluu may refer to:

Punaluu, in Hawaii County, Hawaii
Punaluu, Hawaii, in Honolulu County, Hawaii
Punalu'u Beach, in Hawaii County, Hawaii
Punaluu Kahawai, in Hawaii County, Hawaii